The monument to Primo de Rivera is an instance of public art in Jerez de la Frontera, Spain. It consists of a bronze equestrian statue of Miguel Primo de Rivera, on top of a sculptural ensemble placed inside a fountain.

History and description
The managing committee of the monument was appointed in 1925. The monument was funded via popular subscription. The design of the monument was awarded to Mariano Benlliure.

Building works started on 2 October 1928. Benlliure reportedly used a horse from the regiment of Hussars of La Princesa as model for the equine figure.
The front side of the pedestal features a coat of arms of Spain and an inscription reading:  ("to the illustrious jerezano, restorer of order, Miguel Primo de Rivera y Orbaneja, Peacemaker of Morocco and Marquis of Estella. The grateful homeland").

A winged Victory emerges ahead of the front side of the pedestal, grabbing a laurel branch with her right hand and a Pickelhaube general's helmet with her left arm. Both lateral sides of the pedestal feature sculptural compositions. The right-hand one, with the  inscription ("studying the ultimate breakthrough plan"), consists of a meeting of generals around Primo de Rivera, also attended by Sanjurjo, Despujols, Fernández Pérez, Saro and Admiral Guerra. The left-hand side of the pedestal features an sculptural ensemble with five moors working the land with two oxen, reading  ("the point of victory").

The backside of the monument incorporates an allegory of Peace or Plentifulness, holding cereal spikes, with two cornucopias at her feet, as well as a bronze relief consisting of an effigy of Miguel's brother Fernando—fallen in Monte Arruit in 1921—put inside a medallion bordered by laurel wreaths, with an inscription below reading  ("honoring its heroes").

It was unveiled on 29 September 1929, during a ceremony attended by the dictator himself.

References 
Citations

Bibliography
 
 
 

Buildings and structures in Jerez de la Frontera
Fountains in Spain
Statues of heads of government
Sculptures by Mariano Benlliure
Sculptures of men in Spain
Outdoor sculptures in Andalusia
Bronze sculptures in Spain
Monuments and memorials in Andalusia
Equestrian statues in Spain
Statues of military officers